The Zagreb Marathon is an annual marathon held in October in Zagreb, Croatia. It includes a marathon race, half marathon and 10K run that starts one hour earlier. All races begin and end on Ban Jelačić Square.

History 
The first marathon race in Zagreb was organized in 1992. The track changed a lot in the first years, until 2004, when the start-finish area was moved to the city center, to the Ban Jelačić Square, with half-turns in Dubrava and Črnomerec, which proved to be one of the key organizational elements of the race. In 2005, the half marathon race was introduced. The 2020 edition of the race was canceled due to the COVID-19 pandemic in Croatia, with registrants also having the option of running the race virtually.

Marathon winners 
Key:

* The race was held virtually.

References

External links 
  
  

Marathons in Europe
Athletics competitions in Croatia
Recurring sporting events established in 1992
Annual sporting events in Croatia
Sport in Zagreb